The Allen County Athletic Conference (ACAC) is a seven-member Indiana High School Athletic Association (IHSAA) conference. While all of its charter schools are and were located in Allen County, it also has member schools from Adams, Jay, and Wells counties. The ACAC, along with the Porter County Conference, are the only two county conferences left in existence.

History
The Allen County Athletic Conference began with nine schools in Allen County in 1956. The schools were smaller, rural schools, with the exception of Elmhurst, the sole Fort Wayne school that wasn't included in the Fort Wayne City Series. The conference was hit hard by consolidation, and the nine original schools were down to four by the 1968 season (and two of those were new consolidations). The conference responded by going outside county borders by admitting Norwell (itself a newly consolidated school) in 1967, followed by Adams Central, Churubusco, and Eastside in 1968. The rebooted conference now expanded well outside of the Allen County footprint, including schools from Adams, DeKalb, Wells, and Whitley counties. All of the schools now sponsored football, and competition in that sport began in 1969.

The conference went to a two division format in 1971 with the addition of new school Homestead and Southern Wells. That format ended in 1975, as Homestead left for the Northeastern Indiana Athletic Conference, followed by Eastside leaving for the Northeast Corner Conference in 1980. The breakup of the NEIAC in 1989 led to a wide-scale realignment of conferences in Northeast Indiana, as schools looked to realign themselves with rivals of similar enrolments. The ACAC became the home for mid-sized schools, while the Northeast Corner housed small schools, and the newly formed Northeast Hoosier Conference became the stable for the largest non-Fort Wayne schools. Carroll and Norwell left that year for the NEHC, while Churubusco left for the NECC. They were replaced by NEIAC schools Bluffton and South Adams. Garrett, becoming too large for the Northeast Corner, moved to the Allen County league in 2005.

Jay County joined the conference beginning with the 2014-15 school year. However, the conference shrank down to seven schools in 2015, as Garrett moved to the Northeast Corner Conference in 2014, and Leo joined six of the eight Northeast Hoosier Conference high schools in a new conference (Northeast 8) in 2015.

Membership

Current members

 Adams Central played in the ACAC and the EWVC concurrently for 1965-66, the final year for the EWVC.
 Woodlan was known as Woodburn before 1959.

Former members

 Lafayette Central became part of Roanoke High School in 1963. Roanoke itself consolidated into Huntington North in 1966, taking Lafayette Township with it. The township then split off from HNHS to become part of Southwest Allen County Schools in 1971.

Membership timeline

Division Format 1971-75

Sponsored Sports

Conference Championships

Football 

 1971-74: N = North Division champions, S = South Division champions, C = title game champions (not held in 1973).

Boys Basketball 

 Champions from 1958-59 to 1990-91 not listed are unverified.

Girls Basketball 

 Champions from beginning of competition (ca. 1974-75) until 2000 not listed are unverified.

Wrestling 

Only tournament champions listed.

State titles

Adams Central Flying Jets (1)
2000 Football (A)

Bluffton Tigers (0)

Garrett Railroaders (1)
1974 Football (A)

Heritage Patriots (1)
 1982 girls basketball
 Robert Goff - 3200 Meter Run (1992)

Leo Lions (1)
 2014 Girls Softball (3A)
 2008 Justin Woods, Leo 33-0 215lb State Wrestling Champion

South Adams Starfires (1)
• Davona Runkel - Girls shot put (1986)

Southern Wells Raiders (1)
2001 Football (A)

Woodlan Warriors (0)

External links
IHSAA Conferences
 IHSAA Directory
 IHSAA Classification
 IHSAA Football Classification

References

Indiana high school athletic conferences
Education in Adams County, Indiana
Education in Allen County, Indiana
Education in DeKalb County, Indiana
Education in Wells County, Indiana
Articles which contain graphical timelines
1956 establishments in Indiana